Margaretha Martadinata Haryono (March 21, 1981 – October 9, 1998), or Ita Martadinata Haryono, better known by her nickname, Ita, was a Chinese Indonesian human rights activist who was murdered in 1998, a case which is still unsolved.

Early life 
Ita Martadinata Haryono was born on March 21, 1981, to Wiwin Haryono and Joko Leo Haryono (b. 1949).

Background
At the age of 18 and while a senior year student in Paskalis Senior High School in Jakarta, Ita was found dead on October 9, 1998 in her bedroom in Central Jakarta. Her stomach, chest, and right arm were stabbed ten times, while her neck was slashed. The murder occurred just three days after a Jakarta press conference held by the human rights organizations Ita had been involved with. The groups claimed that several of their members had received death threats in an attempt to stop them calling for an international investigation into the gang-rapes, murder, and burning of Indonesian Chinese girls and women during the May 1998 riot; a riot which ultimately forced Suharto to step down from the presidency.

Death and aftermath
Police concluded that Ita's death was an ordinary crime, committed by a drug addict who had entered Ita's home to rob it. According to the police statement, he was caught in the act by Ita and therefore decided to kill her. However, others question this statement because Ita and her mother, Wiwin Haryono, were due to leave in a few days for the United States together with four victims of the May 1998 riot to present their testimony before the U.S. Congress. Ita and her mother had been deeply involved in giving help and counseling to the victims of the riot.

The group Ita and her mother had worked most closely with, an organization called Tim Relawan untuk Kemanusiaan (Voluntary Team for Humanity), concluded that Ita's murder was a warning to them and others who were involved in this humanitarian effort, to discontinue their activities.

See also
List of unsolved murders

References

External links 
Better Protection Of Rapes Investigators Needed
UN Commission On Human Rights

1998 deaths
Deaths by blade weapons
Female murder victims
Indonesian murder victims
Indonesian people of Chinese descent
People murdered in Indonesia
Unsolved murders in Indonesia